Een Zomerzotheid   is a 1936 Dutch film directed by Hans van Meerten.

Cast
Henry Berg		
Leo de Hartogh		
Pam Ingenegeren		
Jenny Moerdijk		
Elly Sternheim		
Theo Valck-Lucassen		
Adriaan Van Hees

External links 
 

1936 films
Dutch black-and-white films
1930s Dutch-language films